His Chum the Baron is a 1913 American short comedy film. Harold Lloyd is said to have appeared in this film, but this is unconfirmed.

Cast
 Ford Sterling
 Hank Mann
 Edgar Kennedy
 Betty Schade
 Vernon Smith
 Harold Lloyd (unconfirmed)

See also
 Harold Lloyd filmography

External links

1913 films
1913 short films
American silent short films
1913 comedy films
American black-and-white films
Silent American comedy films
American comedy short films
1910s American films